Franjo Šoštarić (1 August 1919 – 27 August 1975) was a Croatian footballer who competed internationally for Yugoslavia.

Club career
Born in Zagreb, he started playing with HAŠK before moving to Građanski Zagreb in 1942 where he became the substitute of Franjo Glaser for the following 3 seasons. With Građanski he won one Croatian championship and two championships of the Zagreb Subassociation.

In 1945 he moved to Belgrade and joined FK Partizan where he would play until 1949 making a total of 239 appearances (84 of which in the league) and win two Yugoslav championships, in 1947 and 1949, and one Yugoslav Cup, in 1947.

International career
Šoštarić made his debut for Yugoslavia in an October 1946 Balkan Cup match against Romania and earned a total of 18 caps, scoring no goals. He was part of the Yugoslav squad at the 1948 Summer Olympics where Yugoslavia won the silver. His final international was a June 1951 friendly match against Switzerland.

Honours

Club
Građanski Zagreb
 Croatian championship: 1943

Partizan
 Yugoslav First League: 1946–47, 1948–49
 Yugoslav Cup: 1947

National team
Yugoslavia
 1948 Summer Olympics: Silver

References

External links
 

1919 births
1975 deaths
Footballers from Zagreb
Association football goalkeepers
Yugoslav footballers
Yugoslavia international footballers
Olympic footballers of Yugoslavia
Olympic silver medalists for Yugoslavia
Footballers at the 1948 Summer Olympics
Olympic medalists in football
Medalists at the 1948 Summer Olympics
HAŠK players
HŠK Građanski Zagreb players
FK Partizan players
Yugoslav First League players
Burials at Belgrade New Cemetery